Marple North is an electoral ward in the Metropolitan Borough of Stockport. It elects three Councillors to Stockport Metropolitan Borough Council using the first past the post electoral method, electing one Councillor every year without election on the fourth.

It covers the northern part of Marple and has two rail stations, both Marple Station and Rose Hill Marple. The ward also contains Brabyns Park as well as Etherow Country Park. Marple North was the seat of former Council Leader and former Cheadle MP Mark Hunter. Together with Bredbury & Woodley, Bredbury Green and Romiley, Hazel Grove, Marple South, and Offerton it constitutes the Hazel Grove Parliamentary constituency.

Councillors
Marple North electoral ward is represented in Westminster by William Wragg MP for Hazel Grove.

The ward is represented on Stockport Council by three councillors: Steve Gribbon (Lib Dem), Becky Senior (Lib Dem), and Malcolm Allan (Lib Dem).

 indicates seat up for re-election.

Elections in the 2010s

May 2019

May 2018

May 2016

May 2015

May 2014

May 2012

May 2011

References

External links
Stockport Metropolitan Borough Council

Wards of the Metropolitan Borough of Stockport
Marple, Greater Manchester